Gastrophryne, the narrowmouth toads (also American narrowmouth toads, North American narrow-mouthed toads), is a genus of microhylid frogs found in the Americas between Honduras and southern United States.

Gastrophryne is closely related to Hypopachus. Some species that were earlier placed in Gastrophryne were more closely related to Hypopachus, rendering the genus paraphyletic. This has been rectified by moving some species (Gastrophryne usta and Gastrophryne pictiventris) to Hypopachus.

Gastrophryne frogs were the first species to be recognized to be experiencing speciation by reinforcement and lead to the coining of the term reinforcement by W. Frank Blair in 1955; a concept proposed by Theodosius Dobzhansky decades earlier.

Species
The currently recognized species are:
 Gastrophryne carolinensis (Holbrook, 1835) - eastern narrow-mouthed toad
 Gastrophryne elegans (Boulenger, 1882) - elegant narrow-mouthed toad
 Gastrophryne mazatlanensis (Taylor, 1943) - Mazatlan narrow-mouthed toad or Sinaloa narrow-mouthed toad
 Gastrophryne olivacea (Hallowell, 1856) - Great Plains narrow-mouthed toad

References

 
Microhylidae
Amphibians of Central America
Amphibians of North America
Amphibian genera
Taxa named by Leopold Fitzinger